Talegaon Dabhade is a village in India, situated in the Mawal taluka of Pune district in the state of Maharashtra.

Administration
The village is administrated by a sarpanch, an elected representative who leads a gram panchayat. At the time of the 2011 Census of India, the gram panchayat governed four villages and was based at Adhale Budruk.

Demographics
At the 2011 census, the village comprised 1711 households. The population of 7373 was split between 4060 males and 3313 females.

See also
List of villages in Mawal taluka

References

Villages in Mawal taluka